Warattaya Nilkuha (born June 11, 1983 in Ratchaburi, Thailand) is a Thai actress and model. She graduated with a Bachelor of Publical Sciences from Thammasat University

Personal life 
On November 16, 2018, she married actor Puttichai Kasetsin. On November 24,2022,she welcome a son.

Filmography

Dramas

Master of Ceremony: MC

Drama Organizer 
 2022 Jangwa Hua Jai Nai Saat - จังหวะหัวใจนายสะอาด (Insight Entertainment, Act9 Productions/PPTVHD36)

References

External links
 Official Site
 

1983 births
Living people
Warattaya Nilkuha
Warattaya Nilkuha
Warattaya Nilkuha
Warattaya Nilkuha
Thai television personalities
Warattaya Nilkuha
Warattaya Nilkuha